Arthur Washer (1855 – 10 November 1910) was a New Zealand cricketer. He played in one first-class match for Canterbury in 1884/85.

See also
 List of Canterbury representative cricketers

References

External links
 

1855 births
1910 deaths
New Zealand cricketers
Canterbury cricketers
Sportspeople from Brighton